The list of ship launches in 2010 includes a chronological list of ships launched in 2010.



References

See also

2010
Ship launches
 
Ship